The women's K-1 canoe slalom competition at the 2012 Olympic Games in London took place between 30 July and 2 August at the Lee Valley White Water Centre.

The gold medal was won by Émilie Fer from France.

Competition format
In the heats, each competitor had two runs; the 15 athletes with the best time qualified for the semi-finals. Each semi-final consisted of one run each and the best 10 qualified for the final. The final was also one run where the canoeist with the best time won the gold medal.

Schedule 
All times are British Summer Time (UTC+01:00)

Results

Gallery

References

Women's slalom K-1
Olymp
Women's events at the 2012 Summer Olympics